The 1936–37 New York Rangers season was the franchise's 11th season. During the regular season, the Rangers posted a third-place finish in the American Division, with a 19–20–9 record. New York qualified for the Stanley Cup playoffs, where the team defeated the Toronto Maple Leafs and Montreal Maroons to reach the Stanley Cup Finals. In the Cup Finals, the Rangers lost to the Detroit Red Wings, three games to two.

Regular season
On November 16, 1936, Hal Winkler made his NHL debut for the New York Rangers and gained a 1–0 shutout over the Montreal Maroons. He was the first goaltender to have a shutout in his NHL debut.

Final standings

Record vs. opponents

Schedule and results

|- align="center" bgcolor="#FFBBBB"
| 1 || 8 || @ Detroit Red Wings || 5–2 || 0–1–0
|- align="center" bgcolor="#CCFFCC"
| 2 || 10 || @ Montreal Maroons || 4–1 || 1–1–0
|- align="center" bgcolor="#FFBBBB"
| 3 || 15 || New York Americans || 2–1 || 1–2–0
|- align="center" bgcolor="#CCFFCC"
| 4 || 17 || @ Boston Bruins || 6–1 || 2–2–0
|- align="center" bgcolor="#CCFFCC"
| 5 || 19 || Detroit Red Wings || 1–0 || 3–2–0
|- align="center" bgcolor="#FFBBBB"
| 6 || 21 || @ Montreal Canadiens || 3 – 1 OT || 3–3–0
|- align="center" bgcolor="#CCFFCC"
| 7 || 24 || Toronto Maple Leafs || 5–1 || 4–3–0
|- align="center" bgcolor="#CCFFCC"
| 8 || 26 || @ New York Americans || 3–1 || 5–3–0
|- align="center" bgcolor="white"
| 9 || 28 || Boston Bruins || 2 – 2 OT || 5–3–1
|-

|- align="center" bgcolor="#FFBBBB"
| 10 || 3 || @ Detroit Red Wings || 2–0 || 5–4–1
|- align="center" bgcolor="#CCFFCC"
| 11 || 6 || @ Chicago Black Hawks || 2–1 || 6–4–1
|- align="center" bgcolor="white"
| 12 || 8 || Chicago Black Hawks || 0 – 0 OT || 6–4–2
|- align="center" bgcolor="#CCFFCC"
| 13 || 12 || @ Toronto Maple Leafs || 5 – 3 OT || 7–4–2
|- align="center" bgcolor="white"
| 14 || 15 || Montreal Maroons || 2 – 2 OT || 7–4–3
|- align="center" bgcolor="#FFBBBB"
| 15 || 19 || @ Montreal Canadiens || 4 – 2 OT || 7–5–3
|- align="center" bgcolor="#CCFFCC"
| 16 || 20 || Montreal Canadiens || 5 – 3 OT || 8–5–3
|- align="center" bgcolor="#CCFFCC"
| 17 || 27 || Chicago Black Hawks || 1–0 || 9–5–3
|- align="center" bgcolor="#CCFFCC"
| 18 || 29 || @ New York Americans || 5–1 || 10–5–3
|- align="center" bgcolor="white"
| 19 || 31 || Boston Bruins || 2 – 2 OT || 10–5–4
|-

|- align="center" bgcolor="#FFBBBB"
| 20 || 3 || @ Boston Bruins || 3–2 || 10–6–4
|- align="center" bgcolor="#CCFFCC"
| 21 || 5 || New York Americans || 7–1 || 11–6–4
|- align="center" bgcolor="#CCFFCC"
| 22 || 9 || @ Montreal Maroons || 3–2 || 12–6–4
|- align="center" bgcolor="#FFBBBB"
| 23 || 10 || Montreal Maroons || 5–2 || 12–7–4
|- align="center" bgcolor="#FFBBBB"
| 24 || 14 || Detroit Red Wings || 2–0 || 12–8–4
|- align="center" bgcolor="white"
| 25 || 19 || Montreal Canadiens || 1 – 1 OT || 12–8–5
|- align="center" bgcolor="#FFBBBB"
| 26 || 21 || @ Chicago Black Hawks || 2–0 || 12–9–5
|- align="center" bgcolor="#FFBBBB"
| 27 || 23 || @ Toronto Maple Leafs || 4–0 || 12–10–5
|- align="center" bgcolor="#CCFFCC"
| 28 || 24 || Toronto Maple Leafs || 4–2 || 13–10–5
|- align="center" bgcolor="#CCFFCC"
| 29 || 26 || @ Boston Bruins || 3–0 || 14–10–5
|- align="center" bgcolor="white"
| 30 || 28 || Boston Bruins || 1 – 1 OT || 14–10–6
|-

|- align="center" bgcolor="white"
| 31 || 2 || Detroit Red Wings || 4 – 4 OT || 14–10–7
|- align="center" bgcolor="white"
| 32 || 4 || @ Detroit Red Wings || 2 – 2 OT || 14–10–8
|- align="center" bgcolor="white"
| 33 || 6 || @ Montreal Maroons || 1 – 1 OT || 14–10–9
|- align="center" bgcolor="#FFBBBB"
| 34 || 7 || Montreal Maroons || 4–2 || 14–11–9
|- align="center" bgcolor="#CCFFCC"
| 35 || 9 || @ Toronto Maple Leafs || 5–1 || 15–11–9
|- align="center" bgcolor="#FFBBBB"
| 36 || 11 || @ Chicago Black Hawks || 5–2 || 15–12–9
|- align="center" bgcolor="#FFBBBB"
| 37 || 14 || New York Americans || 5–4 || 15–13–9
|- align="center" bgcolor="#FFBBBB"
| 38 || 16 || @ Boston Bruins || 3–2 || 15–14–9
|- align="center" bgcolor="#CCFFCC"
| 39 || 18 || Chicago Black Hawks || 2 – 1 OT || 16–14–9
|- align="center" bgcolor="#CCFFCC"
| 40 || 23 || Toronto Maple Leafs || 2–1 || 17–14–9
|- align="center" bgcolor="#FFBBBB"
| 41 || 28 || @ Chicago Black Hawks || 4–3 || 17–15–9
|-

|- align="center" bgcolor="#FFBBBB"
| 42 || 4 || @ Detroit Red Wings || 2–1 || 17–16–9
|- align="center" bgcolor="#FFBBBB"
| 43 || 7 || Boston Bruins || 1–0 || 17–17–9
|- align="center" bgcolor="#CCFFCC"
| 44 || 9 || @ New York Americans || 7 – 5 OT || 18–17–9
|- align="center" bgcolor="#FFBBBB"
| 45 || 11 || Detroit Red Wings || 4–2 || 18–18–9
|- align="center" bgcolor="#FFBBBB"
| 46 || 13 || @ Montreal Canadiens || 1–0 || 18–19–9
|- align="center" bgcolor="#FFBBBB"
| 47 || 16 || Chicago Black Hawks || 4–3 || 18–20–9
|- align="center" bgcolor="#CCFFCC"
| 48 || 21 || Montreal Canadiens || 3–1 || 19–20–9
|-

Playoffs

Stanley Cup Final
The Rangers were unable to play at home after game one due to the circus.

Key:  Win  Loss

Player statistics
Skaters

Goaltenders

†Denotes player spent time with another team before joining Rangers. Stats reflect time with Rangers only.
‡Traded mid-season. Stats reflect time with Rangers only.

Awards and records

Transactions

See also
1936–37 NHL season

References

New York Rangers seasons
New York Rangers
New York Rangers
New York Rangers
New York Rangers
Madison Square Garden
1930s in Manhattan